Writers who have contributed to Oceanian literature include:

A B C D E F G H I J K L M N O P Q R S
T U V W X Y Z 

A
 Thea Astley

B
 Luelen Bernart
 Geoffrey Blainey

C
 Eleanor Catton
 Manning Clark
 Marcus Clarke

D
 Timothy Detudamo
 Flora Devantine
 Alan Duff

E
 Vincent Eri

F
 Sia Figiel
 Miles Franklin
 Janet Frame

G
 Helen Garner
 Patricia Grace
 Germaine Greer
 Charlotte Grimshaw

H
 Epeli Hau'ofa
 Konai Helu Thaman
 Robert Hughes
 Keri Hulme
 Barry Humphries

I
 Witi Ihimaera

J
 Clive James
 Elizabeth Jolley
 Gail Jones
 Lloyd Jones

K
 Jill Ker Conway
 Thomas Keneally
 Albert Maori Kiki
 Ignatius Kilage
 Loujaya Kouza

L
 Henry Lawson
 Nam Le

M
 David Malouf
 Afaese Manoa
 Colleen McCullough
 Andrew McGahan
 Alex Miller
 Grace Molisa

N
 Bernard Narokobi

P
 Banjo Paterson

R
 Misa Telefoni Retzlaff
 Robert Louis Stevenson<ref></Institute for Excellence in Writing>

S
 Maurice Shadbolt
 Russell Soaba
 Michael Somare
 Christina Stead

W
 Albert Wendt
 Morris West
 Patrick White
 David Williamson
 Tim Winton

Z
 Markus Zusak

See also 

:Category:Lists of Australian writers 
List of New Zealand writers

Notes 

 
 
+Oceania